Select Biosciences Ltd. is a company based in the United Kingdom. It provides focused market reports, custom consultancy, training courses, and conferences to the biomedical marketplace. It was founded in 1999.

Select Biosciences now organizes over 100 conferences, training courses and tutorials every year, across Europe, the USA, and Asia.

In 2010, Select Biosciences won the Queen's Award for Enterprise.

References

External links 
 

British companies established in 1999
Bioinformatics companies
Companies based in Suffolk